Shayne Anthony Bennett (born 10 April 1972) is a former Australian rules footballer who played for North Adelaide in the South Australian National Football League (SANFL), and was a right-handed baseball pitcher, who last played in Major League Baseball with the Montreal Expos on 15 August 1999.

The youngest brother to fellow North Adelaide footballer Peter Bennett, Shayne was a leading junior footballer for North Adelaide and was drafted by Victorian Football League (VFL) team Collingwood at the 1989 VFL Draft with the 56th selection.

Bennett never made his senior debut for Collingwood. Instead, he travelled to the United States and started playing baseball at the College of DuPage. 

He was drafted by the Boston Red Sox in the 1993 Major League Baseball draft in the 25th round and, after three years playing in the minor leagues, was traded to the Montreal Expos in January 1996.

He was also a member of the Australia national baseball team, which finished in sixth place at the 2000 Summer Olympics in Sydney.

See also
 List of players from Australia in Major League Baseball

References

External links

1972 births
Australian expatriate baseball players in Canada
Australian expatriate baseball players in the United States
Baseball players at the 2000 Summer Olympics
Living people
Major League Baseball players from Australia
Major League Baseball pitchers
Montreal Expos players
North Adelaide Football Club players
Olympic baseball players of Australia
Australian rules footballers from Adelaide
Parkland Cobras baseball players
Australian expatriate baseball players in South Korea
Australian expatriate baseball players in Taiwan
Doosan Bears players
Fort Lauderdale Red Sox players
Gulf Coast Red Sox players
Harrisburg Senators players
Macoto Gida players
Ottawa Lynx players
Sarasota Red Sox players
Trenton Thunder players